Leanna Maree "Max" Sharam (born 1969) is an Australian interdisciplinary musician and singer-songwriter. In the mid-1990s, Sharam had three top 40 hit singles in Australia, "Coma", "Be Firm" and "Lay Down", from her top 10 album A Million Year Girl (1995). She received eight nominations at the ARIA Music Awards of 1995; winning ARIA Award for Best Cover Art with Dominic O'Brien for the album.

Biography

Early life
Leanna Maree Sharam was born in Benalla, Victoria, in 1969. Following her graduation from arts college, with a major in behavioural science, Sharam moved to Europe.

Early Europe
Sharam spent several years travelling around Europe where she initially made a living from busking. Sharam, while based in Rome, was part of a bohemian community of artists that included Kurt Wenner known for his groundbreaking street art. Whilst performing in Florence, Italy, Carlo Picone, a RAI news journalist and producer, invited her to audition for Forza Venite Gente, a popular Italian rock opera, starring Oreste Lionello, for which she landed a lead role. The musical toured across Europe for two years. Other Italian Theatre productions engaged her, including Kolbe directed by Polish film director – Krzysztof Zanussi and Tadeaus Bradecki. She received the Star of the Year award at Genoa's Cole Porter Festival, recorded and released a dance extended play, "I'm Occupied". Her story was documented in an Italian television program, La Ragazza con la Chitarra ("Girl with the Guitar"), shown on RAI TV.

Climax and comedy
Sharam spent a year in Japan studying Taiko drums and fronting a Japanese band Climax based in Hiroshima before returning to Australia where she worked as a stand-up comedian, performing regularly on the Sydney Comedy Circuit. She also appeared on Red Faces, Hey Hey it's Saturday TV.

1990s
Sharam started a number of small-time Sydney bands, Minx and Gaudi, and performed regularly in an all electronica outfit, Fleshworld.

In 1992, Sharam performed her self-penned song "Coma" on the television talent show New Faces, reaching the finals and attracting the attention of a number of record companies:  Soon after, under the banner of Max Sharam: The Sounds of Sirens, she was performing regular sell-out solo acoustic shows at Kinselas nightclub in Darlinghurst.

1994–1999: A Million Year Girl
Sharam signed a recording contract with Warner Music Australia in 1994, which issued her debut EP, Coma, in October – produced by Daniel Denholm and Nick Mainsbridge – with the song peaking at No. 14 on the ARIA Singles Chart during February 1995.

"Coma" was voted the eighth-most popular song on radio station, Triple J's Hottest 100 of 1994. Her debut album, A Million Year Girl, was released in May 1995, achieving gold accreditation and reaching No. 9 in the ARIA Albums Chart.

At the ARIA Music Awards of 1995 Sharam was nominated in eight categories, losing to Tina Arena and Silverchair, but winning ARIA Award for Best Cover Art for the album with Dominic O'Brien. The album spawned two more Top 40 singles, "Be Firm" (No. 25 in June) and "Lay Down (Candles in the Rain)" (a cover of Melanie Safka's song, which reached No. 36 in November). Her fourth single, "Is It OK If I Call You Mine?", a cover written by Paul McCrane for the film Fame, was released in February 1996 but peaked outside the top 100. After several subsequent sell-out national tours, Sharam disappeared from the Australian mainstream music scene moving to Los Angeles for several years. Sharam re-appeared in Channel 9's TV documentary Dream Factory, shot in Los Angeles.

2000–2009
In 2000 Sharam moved to Manhattan, New York where she continued to write. She wrote and staged her first one-woman show, MadmoselleMax, for the Melbourne International Comedy Festival. In January 2005, she performed "Butterfly Suicide" at the Hong Kong Fringe Festival. The one-woman P'Opera (a "Virtual Variety/Multi Media Musical") featured the misadventures of "ill Soprano", a highly-strung opera diva who takes to the streets at night singing.

In 2006 Sharam portrayed Jean Lee in the musical The Hanging of Jean Lee, which was based on a biographical book of poems by Jordie Albiston. The score was written by Australian composer Andree Greenwell and the musical played at Sydney Opera House alongside Hugo Race.

Sharam performed and produced the music for 2006 AFI award winning documentary Forbidden Lie$ and in 2007 wrote, performed and produced the closing credit song for Expired, a movie starring Samantha Morton, Jason Patric, Illeana Douglas and Teri Garr.

In 2008 Sharam continued to tread new ground and experiment with platforms, creating video performance based art. She was invited to join the New York Foundation for the Arts, a not-for-profit arts organization, panel for Video Art. In February 2009 Sharam returned to the Melbourne International Comedy Festival with her show Songs and Stories from My Suitcase. and followed it up with another more experimental production ″Bushpygmalion″ which featured Sharam's animated artworks in a semi-autobiographical tale. In June, 2017 her performance art was part of an exhibit in Fabrik der Künste in Hamburg, Germany as part of a retrospective for German painter, Tania Jacobi  and then in September 2018 as part of the inaugural Ballarat Biennale of Australia Art (BOAA).

2010–present
Sharam is a Master of Fine Art (MFA) and studied Animation Direction at Australian Film Television & Radio School (AFTRS, Sydney) before graduating from RMIT's Centre for Animation & Interactive Media (AIM) in 2011. In 2011 she was a finalist in the APRA Professional Development Awards and in 2013 The Vanda & Young Songwriting Competition. Sharam also created the music and sound design for the play Anaconda, which won 'Best Original Play' at Hollywood Fringe Festival in 2012.

In 2012, Sharam launched a crowd-funding campaign to raise funds to record new work with Grammy Award-winning producer Malcolm Burn. The new EP, The Gods Envy "songs thematically linked – stories of young girls/women crashing through the safety net of society", was scheduled for an independent release in 2014.

In 2014, Sharam supported Cyndi Lauper on Lauper's 'She's So Unusual' 30th Anniversary Tour.

In April 2019, she performed "Society" at the APRA Music Awards of 2019.

In 2020, Sharam portrayed the ghost of Jean Lee in the docudrama A Miscarriage of Justice based on the hanging of Ronald Ryan.

Discography

Studio albums

Extended plays

Singles

Awards and nominations

ARIA Music Awards
The ARIA Music Awards is an annual awards ceremony that recognises excellence, innovation, and achievement across all genres of Australian music. Sharam won 1 award from 8 nominations.

|-
| rowspan="8"| 1995
| rowspan="3"| "Coma"
| ARIA Award for Single for the Year
| 
|-
| ARIA Award for Song for the Year|Song for the Year
| 
|-
| Breakthrough Artist - single
| 
|-
| rowspan="1"| "Coma" (Paul Elliott)
| ARIA Award for Best Video
| 
|-
| rowspan="3"| A Million Year Girl
| Best Female Artist
| 
|-
| Best New Talent
| 
|-
| Breakthrough Artist - Album
| 
|-
| rowspan="1"| A Million Year Girl (Dominic O'Brien and Max Sharam)
| Best Cover Art
| 
|-

References

External links
 Official website
 

1969 births
ARIA Award winners
Australian songwriters
Australian women singers
Interdisciplinary artists
Living people